In theoretical physics, the dual photon is a hypothetical elementary particle that is a dual of the photon under electric–magnetic duality which is predicted by some theoretical models, including M-theory.

It has been shown that including magnetic monopole in Maxwell's equations introduces a singularity. The only way to avoid the singularity is to include a second four-vector potential, called dual photon, in addition to the usual four-vector potential, photon. Additionally, it is found that the standard Lagrangian of electromagnetism is not dual symmetric (i.e. symmetric under rotation between electric and magnetic charges) which causes problems for the energy–momentum, spin, and orbital angular momentum tensors. To resolve this issue, a dual symmetric Lagrangian of electromagnetism has been proposed, which has a self-consistent separation of the spin and orbital degrees of freedom. The Poincaré symmetries imply that the dual electromagnetism naturally makes self-consistent conservation laws.

Dual electromagnetism

The free electromagnetic field is described by a covariant antisymmetric tensor  of rank 2 by

where  is the electromagnetic potential.

The dual electromagnetic field  is defined as

For the electromagnetic field and its dual field, we have

Then, for a given gauge field , the dual configuration  is defined as 

where  the field potential of the dual photon, and non-locally linked to the original field potential .

p-form electrodynamics

A p-form generalization of Maxwell's theory of electromagnetism is described by a gauge-invariant 2-form  defined as

.

which satisfies the equation of motion

where  is the Hodge star operator.

This implies the following action in the spacetime manifold :

where  is the dual of the gauge-invariant 2-form  for the electromagnetic field.

Dark photon

The dark photon is a spin-1 boson associated with a U(1) gauge field, which could be massless and behaves like electromagnetism. But, it could be unstable and massive, quickly decays into electron–positron pairs, and interact with electrons.

The dark photon was first suggested in 2008 by Lotty Ackerman, Matthew R. Buckley, Sean M. Carroll, and Marc Kamionkowski to explain the 'g–2 anomaly' in experiment E821 at Brookhaven National Laboratory. Nevertheless, it was ruled out in some experiments such as the PHENIX detector at the Relativistic Heavy Ion Collider at Brookhaven.

In 2015, the Hungarian Academy of Sciences's Institute for Nuclear Research in Debrecen, Hungary, suggested the existence of a new, light spin-1 boson, dubbed the X17 particle, 34 times heavier than the electron that decays into a pair of electron and positron with a combined energy of 17 MeV. In 2016, it was proposed that it is an X-boson with a mass of 16.7 MeV that explains the g−2 muon anomaly.

See also

  
 
 
 
 Magnetic photon, a different extension for magnetic monopoles

References

Gauge bosons
Bosons
String theory
Hypothetical elementary particles
Quantum electrodynamics
Magnetic monopoles
Force carriers